The Rawe Rajput is a subcaste of Rajputs found in the Indian states of Delhi and Uttar Pradesh. They claim descendancy from eminent rulers of aristocratic Rajput clans. The variations of the name include Raya/Raye/Rava/Rave/Rawa/Rawe Rajput

History

The Rawa Rajput community is famous for their role in the First War of Independence. The Rawa Rajputs had completely sacrificed themselves in eradicating the British. The spirit, strength, self-confidence and unmatched unity with which they fought had left the British spirits down. A huge number of people of this community including the illustrious Landlord families had all perished in the rebellion. Their houses were burnt and their crops were destroyed.

After the revolt, the total remaining population of this community was as follows:
Uttar Pradesh - 25,451 (1891 census)
Muzaffarnagar - 6,042
Meerut - 8,270
Bijnor - 11,139
Delhi - 2,285 (1901 census)

The Gujars were considered the traditional enemies of the Rawa rajputs. They used to come together in huge numbers and loot this wealthy community. One such incident took place at Barampur, a very big village of Rawa Rajputs in the Bijnor district. Thousands of Gujars gathered from both sides of the Ganges to make this attack. Some Meo muslims were also with them. They joined together to loot the village for eight days. Houses were dug up and property taken out. Houses were set alight. Taking into consideration all the assets looted, the total loss amounted to Rs. 3,00,000 which is equivalent to almost Rs. 5,00,00,000 of today. It is also well known that 30,000 maunds (11,19,600 kg) of coarse sugar was seized and later sold off at the going rate for wheat.

Subdivisions

Rawa Rajputs are associated with only 6 of the 36 Rajput clans. The Vansh, Rishi Gotra, Ancestor and Shakhas of these clans are as follows : -

Suryavanshi 

1. Gehlot/Sisodia (Vaishampayan gotra) : Descendants of Lav (Son of Lord Ram)

Shakhas - gahalot, ahaad/ahaadiyaan, baaliyaan and dhaakiyaan and badang

2. Kushwaha (Manu/Maanav gotra) : Descendants of Kush (Son of Lord Ram)

Shakhas - kushavaaha, deshavaal, kaushik and karakachh

Chandravanshi 

3. Tanwar (Vyas gotra) : Descendants of Abhimanyu (Son of Pandav Arjun)

Shakhas - tanvar, tomar, sumaal, gandharv, mogha, paatharaan, paandoo, chaudharaan, thakran, soorayaan, bharbhaaniyaa, sansaariyaa/chandsaariyaa, mahaliyan, maalhayaan, malyan, bahue, rojhe, roliyaan, chaubiyaan, khose, chhanakate, katoch, beebe, jhab‍be, jhapaal, kapaasiyaa, dairwaar, jinwaar, kaaakteey, laakiyaan, laakhe and tibbal

4. Yaduvanshi (Atri gotra) : Descendants of Yadu (Ancestor of Lord Krishna)

Shakhas - yadu, paatalaan, khaariyaa, in‍doriyaa, chhokar/chochar and maahiyaan

Agnivanshi 

5. Chauhan (Vats/Vakchhas gotra) :

Shakhas - chauhaan, khaaree/khair, chanchal, kataaria, boodhiyaan, baadiyaan/baadhiyaan, gurood/gared, kanhaidaa/kaanhad, dhaariyaa, daahiwaal, gaangiyaan, sahcharaan/sachchraan and maakal/maakad/bankde/bhaakad

6. Panwar (Vashishth gotra) :

Shakhas - panvaar, tondak, vaashish‍thaan, ojalaan, daahariya, udiyaan, kiranapaal and bhatede

Knowingly or unknowingly, people have started using these shakhas (branches) of the clans as gotra. This increases the chances of marriage within the same gotra which is otherwise prohibited.

Present culture

The Rawa Rajput community is a small one with the total population of around 1 lakh. They speak Khari boli as well as standard Hindi. Most of them use Singh as the Middle name and their Kul as the Last name. They are credited to have started widow remarriage among the rajputs.

Bhaatts

Their genealogical records are maintained by their family Bhaatts. The Bhaatts sing those records traditionally from their "Pothis" (diaries) and get duly rewarded.

Deities

They are Hindu and mainly worship their Devtas (spirits of the departed ancestors) through the medium of Thaan (a miniature hut like structure made on an elevated base where Devtas are believed to be residing). They also occasionally worship their Gram Devtas.

Rawa Sammelan
 
The community has a caste council known as the Rawa Sammelan to resolve disputes and deal with the problems within the community at the village and inter-village levels. The caste council is headed by a Chaudhary of the Biradri.

Doyaj fair of Shahbazpur

There is a 2 day fair held around the Budhe Baba's temple in Shahbazpur village of Mandawar, Bijnor. It is locally called as Kelawala ki Doyaj. This fair is well known for the fact that the Rawa Rajput community of Bijnor had a tradition of fixing their marriages in it. The youth of the community used to reach there on the pretext of the fair and upon the approval of both boy and girl, their marriage was fixed by the elders.

Villages

The Rawa Rajput community is scattered in about 150 villages in the States of Delhi and Uttar Pradesh.
In Uttar Pradesh, the community is settled in the western districts. The villages in Uttar Pradesh are as follows -
 
 A Chougama (4 villages) around Budhana in Muzaffarnagar District
 A Satgama (7 villages) around Baghpat and Baraut in Meerut District
 A few villages in Sayyidwada (called so because of the huge population of Sayyids in that area) around Khatauli in Muzaffarnagar District
 A Chaurasi (84 villages) spread on both sides of the Malini river in Bijnor District 
 And many more nearby villages in these districts only like Sujra, Ram Nagar etc.
 
In Delhi, the community is settled approximately in the centre. The villages in Delhi are as follows -
 
Khampur
Aryapura and Wazirpur
Naraina, Madipur, Basai Darapur, Titarpur and Nangal Raya

Notable personalities
Sunidhi Chauhan (Singer)
Neha Tanwar (Cricketer)
Gajendra Chauhan (Actor Yudhishthir of BR Chopra's Mahabharat)
Karan Singh Tanwar (Politician)
Mukesh Suryan (Politician)
Pradyumn Rajput (Politician)

References

Social groups of Uttar Pradesh
Rajput clans of Uttar Pradesh
Rajput clans
Social groups of Delhi
Rajput clans of Delhi